Martha Ama Akyaa Pobee (born 4 September) is a Ghanaian diplomat who has been serving as Assistant Secretary-General of the United Nations for Africa at the United Nations Secretariat since 2021. In this capacity, she is part of the United Nations Department of Political and Peacebuilding Affairs.

Before joining the UN, Pobee was Ghana's first female Permanent Representative to the United Nations. She was appointed in July 2015 by the former President John Dramani Mahama.

Education
Pobee obtained her bachelor's degree in English and philosophy from the University of Ghana and her master's degree in development studies from the International Institute of Social Studies in The Hague. She also studied multilateral diplomacy at the Graduate Institute of International and Development Studies (IHEID) and Public Administration at the Ghana Institute of Management and Public Administration (GIMPA).

Career 
Pobee was a career diplomat, serving in the Ministry for Foreign Affairs. She was posted in Tel Aviv from 2000 until 2004. She was Head of Chancery at the Ghanaian Embassy in Washington D.C. from 2006 until 2010. 

From 2010 to 2012, Pobee was the Director of the Information and Public Affairs Bureau at the Ministry for Foreign Affairs. She later became   the Deputy Head of Mission at the Ghana High Commission in Pretoria from 2012 until her appointment as Ghana's Permanent Representative to the UN by President John Dramani Mahama in July 2015.

Personal life 
Pobee is married to John Samuel Pobee, an Anglican priest and Emeritus Professor. The ceremony took place at the University of Ghana on 26 July 1994. She is a Roman Catholic.

References

Year of birth missing (living people)
Living people
University of Ghana alumni
Graduate Institute of International and Development Studies alumni
International Institute of Social Studies alumni
Permanent Representatives of Ghana to the United Nations
Ghanaian women ambassadors